Grotta Azzura, named for the Blue Grotto on the Isle of Capri is an Italian restaurant on the corner of Mulberry Street and Broome Street in the Little Italy section of the borough of Manhattan in New York City. The dining establishment was founded in 1908 by the Davino family and reopened in October 2003 in its original space after having been shut for six years. It is noted for having been a frequent haunt of Frank Sinatra and the Rat Pack as well as Enrico Caruso.  In its later incarnation, it was a hangout for Heath Ledger, the young actor who spent some of his final days living in a rented loft space at 41 Broome street just down the street from the eatery.

Grotta Azzura was one of the first places to serve "Lobster Fra Diavolo" (brother devil in Italian), an Italian American dish rather than a continental Italian one. Wine expert Victor Hazan and his wife the chef Marcella Hazan once told The New York Times that they first remembered eating it there circa 1940. Marcella went on to say "You brought me to that restaurant. I remember the dish clearly because it was so heavy and typical of Italian cooking in America. We don't eat like that in Italy".

In 1977, a member of the restaurant's founding family, John Davino published a book of recipes associated with the establishment called The Recipes of the Grotta Azzurra.

In 2019 Bob Dylan depicted the restaurant in a painting he titled  "Litte Italy".

See also
 List of restaurants in New York City

References

1908 establishments in New York City
Italian-American culture in New York City
Italian restaurants in New York City
Restaurants in Manhattan
Restaurants established in 1908